Corringham is a civil parish in the West Lindsey district of Lincolnshire, England. Corringham comprises the two contiguous villages of Great Corringham and Little Corringham and at the 2011 census had a recorded population of 523.

The hamlet of Yawthorpe lies due east of the village, and that of Bonsdale to the north.

Gowin Knight, the first principal librarian of the British Museum was born here in 1713.

References

External links

Corringham (Great and Little Corringham), Genuki.org.uk

Villages in Lincolnshire
Civil parishes in Lincolnshire
West Lindsey District